The Court of Chancery was the court with jurisdiction in cases of equity in the state of Michigan between 1836 and 1847, presided over by a Chancellor. In certain cases, appeal could be made to the Michigan Supreme Court.

The law creating the Court of Chancery took effect July 4, 1836 and it was abolished on March 1, 1847, with its jurisdiction given to the circuit courts. During this time, only two men served as Chancellor. The Chancellor was an ex officio member of the Board of Regents of the University of Michigan.

List of chancellors of Michigan 
 1836–1842 Elon Farnsworth
 1842–1846 Randolph Manning
 1846–1847 Elon Farnsworth

References

Further reading 

 

History of Michigan
Michigan state courts
Courts of equity
 
Legal history of the United States
Defunct state courts of the United States
1836 establishments in Michigan Territory
1847 disestablishments in the United States
Courts and tribunals established in 1836
Courts and tribunals disestablished in 1847